Kenneth Raymond Newbey (11 June 1936 – 24 July 1988) was a plant ecologist, botanical collector and horticulturist. Born in Katanning, Western Australia, he collected over 12000 specimens from the Albany-Esperance, Wheatbelt, goldfields and Pilbara regions of Western Australia.

He died in White Gum Valley in 1988.

His collection was incorporated into the CALM office in Albany.

The shrub Leucopogon newbeyi was named in his honour.

Publications
Publications include
 West Australian Wildflowers for Horticulture (1968, two volumes), one of the seminal works introducing native plants into horticulture in Western Australia

References

 

1936 births
1988 deaths
Botanists active in Australia
Botany in Western Australia
Scientists from Western Australia
People from Katanning, Western Australia
Plant ecologists
20th-century Australian botanists